3β-Hydroxytibolone (developmental code name ORG-30126) is a synthetic steroidal estrogen which was never marketed. Along with 3α-hydroxytibolone and δ4-tibolone, it is a major active metabolite of tibolone, and 3α-hydroxytibolone and 3β-hydroxytibolone are thought to be responsible for the estrogenic activity of tibolone.

References

Abandoned drugs
Alkene derivatives
Ethynyl compounds
Diols
Estranes
Human drug metabolites
Synthetic estrogens